Verkhnemambetovo (Ürge Mämbät) is a rural locality (a village) in Akmurunsky Selsoviet, Baymaksky District, Bashkortostan, Russia. The population was 162 as of 2010. There are 4 streets.

Geography 
Verkhnemambetovo is located 14 km southwest of Baymak (the district's administrative centre) by road. Baymak is the nearest rural locality.

References 

Rural localities in Baymaksky District